This is a list of festivals in Romania.

By type

Music

Jazz, Rock, Electronic

World Music
 Outernational Days – a fresh and ambitious world music festival right in the heart of Bucharest. (Official website)
 BalKaniK Festival (world music), Uranus Garden- Bucharest, (Official website)

Classical
 Bucharest Early Music Festival – dedicated to the European early music: from Medieval to Renaissance, Baroque and Byzantine (Official page)
 George Enescu Festival – Classical Music. (Official website)
 Transilvania International Guitar Festival – Classical Guitar Music at Cluj-Napoca. (Official website)
 Harmonia Cordis International Guitar Festival – Classical/Jazz/Flamenco Guitar Music at Târgu Mureș. (Official website)
 Novum Generatio International Guitar Days – Classical Guitar Music at Cluj-Napoca. (Official website)
 Terra Siculorum International Classical Guitar Festival & Competition – Classical Guitar Music and Competition at Odorheiu Secuiesc. (discontinued from 2015) (Official page)
 Toamna Muzicală Clujeană
 Classix Festival (Official page)
 Early Music Festival Miercurea-Ciuc

Others

 Electric Castle – Romania's most amazing festival, set in the historic domain of the Banffy Castle, the "Versailles of Transylvania", Bonțida, Cluj County (Official website)
Gigahertz Music Festival (Open air festival) Annually between the dates 30 April – 3 May, at Șuncuiuș 
 Transylvania Calling – Gathering of the Tribes (Transformational Open Air Festival) Sibiu/Brașov. (Official page)
 EUROPAfest – International festival of jazz, blues, pop and classical music (Official website)
 (RIP 2003-2013) Peninsula / Félsziget Festival – rock, metal, pop, electro etc. at Târgu Mureș; One of Romania's biggest music festivals.
 Festivalul Plai – Timișoara
 Delta Music Fest – Sfantu Gheorghe – Delta Dunarii (Official website)
 IAȘI Guitar Festival – Iași (official site)
 Green Island
 MusicForKids – Iași (official site)
 Plopstock – Satu Mare (official site)
 International light music festival "George Grigoriu" – Brăila (official site)
 Sunwaves Festival – Mamaia (official site) (5 Best Music Festivals in Romania)
 Neversea Festival – Neversea(official site) (Neversea – Untold at the sea side)
Rockstadt Extreme Fest – Râșnov (official site)

Photography 

 Bucharest Photofest – the most important international photography festival of the Capital of Romania (Official website)
 In/Out Transylvania Photography Festival – international documentary photography festival
 Photo Romania Festival – Cluj-Napoca (official site)

Theatre
 Festivalul Internațional de Teatru Clasic – Arad
 Shakespeare International Theatre Festival of Craiova – National Theatre of Craiova 
 Avram Goldfaden Festival – Iași
 FITS – International Theater Festival, Sibiu (official site)
 International Theatre Festival for Children and Youth (FITCT) – Luceafărul Theatre, Iași (official site)
 EuroArt Iași – Iași (official site)
 PERFORM – Iași (official site)
 ContemporanIS – Iași (official site)
 Iași Fringe Festival – Iași

Cinema
 ALTER-NATIVE – International Short Film Festival, Târgu Mureș (official site)
 Anim'est – International Animation Film Festival, Bucharest (official site)
 Anonimul – International Independent Film Festival, Sfântu Gheorghe, Tulcea (official site)
 Astra Film Festival – International Documentary and Visual Anthropology Film Festival, Sibiu (official site)
Brașov International Film Festival & Market, Brașov (official site )
 ClujShorts - International Short Film Festival, Cluj-Napoca (official site)
 Comedy Cluj, International Comedy Film Festival, Cluj-Napoca (official site)
 DaKINO – Bucharest International Film Festival (official site)
 FILM.DOK – Documentary Film Festival, Miercurea Ciuc (official site)
 F-Sides – Feminist Film Festival, Bucharest (official site)
 Gay Film Nights – LGBT Film Festival, Cluj-Napoca
 IPIFF – The Independent Producers International Film Festival, Constanța (official site)
 Kinodiseea Children's Film Festival, Bucharest, (official site)
 NexT Film Festival – International Short Film Festival, Bucharest (official site – in Romanian)
 One World Romania – International documentary film festival about human rights, Bucharest (official site)
 Timishort Film Festival – International Short Film Festival, Timișoara (official site)
 Transilvania International Film Festival, Cluj-Napoca (official site)
 Where is the love? – International Short Film Festival, Bucharest (official site)

Mountain 

 Transylvania Mountain Festival (official website)

Others
 RoBurn - Romania's Burning Man regional event
 Picnic Fonic - primarily techno music; also, ecstatic dance, yoga, various workshops. First held in 2016.
 Mumush - Music, arts&crafts, circus, kids area, yoga, meditation
 Sighișoara Medieval Festival – Cultural (Medieval revival). Official page
 [https://iswint.ro International Student Week in Timișoara

See also

List of music festivals

References

External links

 5 Best Music Festivals in Romania To Fill Your Summer With

Romanian culture
 
Festivals
Romania